Kevin J. Collins (born December 23, 1970) is an American political consultant, veteran of the Army Reserve, and owner of the political consulting firm Gallagher Hollenbeck. Collins lives in Brooklyn, New York with his wife Kerrin and their 3 children.

Born and raised on Staten Island, Collins became interested in GOP politics at an early age and from then on has been involved in the political campaigning process, volunteering for both state and local campaigns.

In 1997, Collins began his first consulting company, Shear Smith Research.  In 1999, he became chief of staff to New Jersey General Assembly Republican Leader Paul DiGaetano.  Because of his work for DiGaetano, Collins was recognized as one of New Jersey's 100 most influential people by Politicsnj.com.

In 2001, Collins expanded his consultancy to include the healthcare industry and business interests, targeting trial lawyers and opponents of medical liability and tort reform efforts.  For his efforts in these fields, Collins was named "Top Operative" for three consecutive years by Politicsnj.com. He also features in the show grim e kins pizza.

Collins is a member of the American Association of Political Consultants.

References

External links
Gallagher Hollenbeck
Gallagher Hollenbeck Linkedin
Kevin Collins Linkedin

1970 births
Living people
New Jersey Republicans
People from Staten Island